, also known as Kaiji: The Ultimate Gambler, is a 2009 Japanese live-action film based on Gambling Apocalypse: Kaiji, the first part of the manga series Kaiji, written and illustrated by Nobuyuki Fukumoto. It is the first film of a trilogy directed by Tōya Satō and premiered in Japan on October 10, 2009. It was followed by Kaiji 2, released in 2011.

Cast
Tatsuya Fujiwara as Kaiji Itō
Yūki Amami as Rinko Endō
Teruyuki Kagawa as Yukio Tonegawa
Ken Mitsuishi as Kōji Ishida
Kenichi Matsuyama as Makoto Sahara
Tarō Yamamoto as Jōji Funai
Suzuki Matsuo as Tarō Ōtsuki
Kei Satō as Kazutaka Hyōdō

Production
In October 2008, it was announced that the film would be directed by Tōya Satō and Tatsuya Fujiwara would star as Kaiji Itō. The Watarase Film Commission, a non-governmental organization that supports film production, posted a casting call for 70 men between the ages of 20 and 40 to be extras to play contestants of the "restricted rock-paper-scissors" game.

Soundtrack
Yugo Kanno composed the music for the film. The original score was released on October 7, 2009. Two songs by Japanese pop singer-songwriter Yui were featured in the film, "It's All Too Much" and "Never Say Die", used as theme song and insert song respectively.

Release
Kaiji was theatrically released on October 10, 2009 in Japan. It was released on Blu-ray and DVD on April 9, 2010.

In the UK, the film was released on DVD by 4Digital Media under the title Kaiji: The Ultimate Gambler on July 26, 2010.

Reception
In September 2011, Goo Ranking conducted a web poll of "Live-Action Manga/Anime Adaptations That Worked" and Kaiji ranked #6 out of 38 live-action adaptations.

Box office
The film became Japan's sixteenth highest-grossing film of 2009, earning  at the Japanese box office that year. Overseas, the film grossed $460,073, bringing the film's worldwide total to $25,460,073.

Critical reception
Carlo Santos of Anime News Network ranked Kaiji: The Ultimate Gambler as a C. Santos wrote that the greatest strengths of the film are the psychological gamesmanship and the theory of gambling games, preserving the spirit of the original work. He criticized the characters' one-dimensional characterization, the "artificial" closed-room scenarios and the "contrived" staging of "scrappy working-class hero versus evil old rich guy", stating that Kaiji could be labeled as a "fantasy". Santos also mentioned the changes from the original work and the "awkward plot manuevers" to make the events fit in the film's two-hour time frame. Chris MaGee of Toronto J-Film Pow-Wow described the film as a "very uncomfortable mix" between the social commentary of the 2009 film Kani Kōsen, Tatsuya Fujiwara's first starring role in the 2000 film Battle Royale, and televised poker shows. He criticized the "over-the-top" acting of Fujiwara, Kenichi Matsuyama and Teruyuki Kagawa, stating that "William Shatner would end up telling Kagawa that it might be a good idea to dial things down a little bit. It seems that in the world of Kaiji more always equals better." He concluded "I could only see director Toya Sato and the producers of Kaiji the film being entertained by its game show strategies and hyper-dramatics. For those of us unfortunate enough to be sitting in the audience the whole experience is just painful. Not to give away any spoilers, but the fact that the film's ending leaves things wide open for a sequel or sequels makes me shudder."

References

External links
 Official website 
 VAP official website  
 Nippon TV English official website
 
 

Films about death games
Films set in Japan
Films about gambling
2000s Japanese-language films
Kaiji (manga)
Live-action films based on manga
Toho films
Films directed by Tōya Satō